Seelig Bartell "Bushie" Wise (August 7, 1913 - September 4, 2004) was a Republican member of the Mississippi State Senate, representing the 11th district (Coahoma County), from 1964 to 1968. He was the first Republican Mississippi state senator since Reconstruction.

Biography 
Seelig Bartell Wise was born on August 7, 1913, in Jonestown, Mississippi. He received a B. S. degree in agriculture from Mississippi State University. He then became a cotton farmer in Coahoma County. He became a Captain in the U. S. Army. In 1964, he became the first Republican Mississippi state senator since Reconstruction when he was elected to represent the state's 11th senatorial district, which consisted of Coahoma County. He died on September 4, 2004, in Jackson, Mississippi.

References 

1913 births
2004 deaths
Republican Party Mississippi state senators
Politicians from Jackson, Mississippi
People from Jonestown, Mississippi
United States Army officers